The Siege of Khillia and White Fortresses is a part of the Moldavian–Ottoman Wars. After the Ottoman occupation of Dobruja it was the first encounter of Moldavia and the Ottoman Empire in a battle. The battle was fought between The Moldavian Voivode Alexander the Good and the Ottoman Sultan Mehmed I Çelebi in the year 1420.

Following the year 1418, after the death of Mircea the Elder of Wallachia, the small principality who had given the Ottoman Empire a hard time trying to expand its territory was now finally an Ottoman vassal. This was a positive development for the Ottoman Sultan Mehmed I Çelebi, however a cause of concern for Voivode of Moldavia Alexander the Good as he had lost an ally against the Ottoman threat. The Ottoman desire to expand their holdings in Eastern Europe resulted in the empire coming into conflict with the Principality of Moldavia. In the night of July 5 1420 Moldavia was attacked by the Ottomans. They first sieged Khillia before attacking the White Fortress by the Black Sea. Alexander the Good of Moldavia managed to protect both fortresses and expelled the Ottomans from the country, making it the first military encounter Moldavia had with the Ottoman Empire.

References 

Battles involving the Ottoman Empire
Battles involving Moldavia
15th-century conflicts